Sub-zero literally means "beneath zero".  As such, it is usually used for negative numbers; the most common usage refers to negative temperature.

Sub-zero can also refer to:

Fictional characters

 Sub-Zero (Mortal Kombat), one of the characters from the video game series Mortal Kombat
 Noob Saibot, a character introduced in Mortal Kombat II and later established as the original Sub-Zero from Mortal Kombat
Mortal Kombat Mythologies: Sub-Zero, a spin-off video game
 Sub-Zero (G.I. Joe), a fictional character in the G.I. Joe universe
 Sub-Zero, one of the "stalkers" from the movie The Running Man

Film and television

Sub Zero (film), a 2005 Canadian action film directed by Jim Wynorski
Sub Zero (game show), a 1999–2001 British television game show for children produced by the BBC
Batman & Mr. Freeze: SubZero, an animated 1998 film

Other
SubZero (webcomic)
Subzero (band), a hardcore punk band
Subzero (horse), (1988-2020) an Australian racehorse that won the 1992 Melbourne Cup
SUB ZERO (brand), outdoor clothing brand name
Sub-Zero (brand), refrigerator brand name
Subzero, a Geometry Dash spin-off game made by Robtop Games for mobile phones
"Sub-Zer0", a song by Ho99o9 from the album United States of Horror